Coalclaims or Coal Health Claims is the collective name for two compensation schemes run by the UK Government. Responsibility for the claims lies with the Department of Energy and Climate Change which split off from the Department for Business, Enterprise and Regulatory Reform (BERR) in October 2008. BERR itself was a rename of the Department of Trade and Industry (DTI).
 
These schemes exist to compensate UK coal miners and their families in relation to respiratory disease and Vibration white finger (VWF).  These are the biggest personal injury schemes in British legal history and possibly the world. The claims are processed for the government by Capita (formerly IRISC who were acquired by Aon Corporation who sold the IRISC part of their operation to Capita in 2004).

Claims are processed using a system known as ICMS (IRISC Claims Management System) which is as custom application written in FoxPro). This system integrates with the BCRDL (British Coal Respiratory Disease Litigation) Pension Loss Calculator that was developed by Workflow Consulting Limited under joint instruction from the British Government and the CSG (Claimant Solicitors Group).

Claimant solicitors can also track their cases using a government sponsored website  the current version of this was built and is operated by Web Technology Group. Prior to 2003 it was operated by Integrated Solutions Consultants Ltd of Hemel Hempstead who used to have the domain www.isc.co.uk though this has now been resold.

For the BCRDL scheme calculators to calculate the portion of quantum attributable to the miner's exposure to coal dust and their pension loss can be downloaded from the BCRDL maintained by Workflow Consulting Limited.

Coal Health Claims 
Miners who worked at british coal also known as the National Coal Board can use the help for miners scheme and claim for industrial compensation using the Industrial disease benefit scheme or use the Help for Miners Compensation

Controversy 

As of November 2008, two solicitors who won personal injury claims for thousands of miners have appeared before a tribunal accused of taking cuts from compensation pay-outs. Jim Beresford, 58, and Douglas Smith, 51, from Beresfords Solicitors in Doncaster, denied 11 allegations of misconduct at the hearing in London.Jim Beresford was notably the highest paid solicitor in the UK for the year of 2006 as a consequence of Coalclaims work.

References

Department of Energy and Climate Change